The Computer Channel was a British satellite television channel run by British Satellite Broadcasting (BSB) from 28 June to 29 November 1990.

The channel was broadcast on the same frequency as BSB's Sports Channel, while it was off-air in the mornings.

The Computer Channel was created to broadcast specialist training programmes for the computer industry. The Analysis programme covered IT news, interviews and reviews of new products. The editor and main presenter was Clive Couldwell, former editor of Which Computer magazine.

The channel was not for home viewing by the general public, and so was not promoted in most BSB advertising, or on their other channels. It was part of BSB's Datavision subsidiary, which offered encrypted television services and data reception to business users through BSB's domestic TV receivers.

References

Defunct television channels in the United Kingdom
English-language television stations in the United Kingdom
1990 establishments in the United Kingdom
1990 disestablishments in the United Kingdom
Television channels and stations established in 1990
Television channels and stations disestablished in 1990
1990 in the United Kingdom
1990 in British television
1990s in the United Kingdom
1990s in British television
History of television in the United Kingdom